The Game is a non-stop 24- to 48-hour treasure hunt, puzzlehunt or road rally that has run in the San Francisco Bay and Seattle areas. Its teams use vans rigged with power and Internet access and drive hundreds of miles from puzzle site to puzzle site, overcoming often outrageous physical and mental challenges along the way, usually with no sleep. Teams in games have been required to walk around the roof of the Space Needle, find a puzzle hidden in a live rat, and circulate a petition to ban dihydrogen monoxide from local ecosystems while dressed in superhero outfits.

Game founder Joe Belfiore has described the Game as "the ultimate test for Renaissance men and women."

History
The earliest roots of The Game can be found in games created in Los Angeles in 1973 by a graphic designer named Donald Luskin and longtime friend, Patrick Carlyle.  Teams competed all night long solving puzzles across L.A. for a $100 first prize. The game was a mostly underground affair, but eventually drew the attention of the Los Angeles Times. and later the Walt Disney Company, who produced a movie, Midnight Madness, based on Luskin's game.

In 1985 Joe Belfiore (at that time a student at Clearwater Central Catholic High School) and his friends, inspired by Midnight Madness, created a race like the one in the film. They played four more games before Joe moved to Stanford University to go to school. With Stanford classmates Eli Ben-Shoshan and Andrew Reisner, he created the Bay Area Race Fantastique (BARF) which occurred six times before changing its name to 'The Game'.  There are some interesting notes about the initial BARFs and number of teams that actually completed them due to the hyper-competitive aspect of the BARF format. The term "Gentleman's Game" was used to describe the Stanford Game shortly after Joe Belfiore graduated, meaning there was no prize for winning, only bragging rights.

Two more events were held in the Bay Area before Joe Belfiore moved to Seattle to work for Microsoft, taking the official "The Game" with him (although the San Francisco Bay Area people still consider their games to also be "The Game").  Structurally, the two Games are identical, but the Seattle Games tend to be more competitive and require more technological gear.  The post-Stanford Games were organized in Seattle, Napa/Sonoma, New York, Los Angeles and Las Vegas throughout 1995–2002.

Currently, versions of The Game (both full-blown and abbreviated foot-transportation-only) are organized regularly by Stanford dorm staff members as a bonding activity for their residents.  Similarly, Microsoft continues running the "Intern Game" for summer interns, organized by Stanford Alums employed at Microsoft.

Structure
The general structure of The Game is a series of puzzle challenges, often called "Clues".  Each challenge solves to the location where the next challenge can be found.  During the course of The Game, a team will often travel all around a metropolitan area.

Usually there is an overall theme to the clues, or even a story that ties all the clues together.

Game communities
The next Game each year would typically be run by whatever team felt the ability, chutzpah and desire to do so. In the early days of BARF and in the subsequent Seattle Games, the first-right-of-refusal fell to the team who won the previous Game.   Future Game Controls (GCs) in the Bay Area tended to rely on the expertise of previous GCs and the so-called legitimacy of owning the "Captain's List".   In the Bay Area there is no "Central System" or "Central Ownership" per se, but rather an autonomous collective of Gamers (a group of teams that communicate with one another) and a group-moderated site.

As the Game grew, it became increasingly more high-tech and more psychological in nature, a result of each Game trying to "outdo" the previous Games.  For instance, a team member might find themselves stripped of all clothes and spectacles, be dressed in nothing but a hospital gown, have the next puzzle be written on the back of their neck in reverse lettering, and then be deposited at a strip club.  Teams became increasingly competitive and would even break the rules and mislead other teams in order to gain an advantage, much to the fellow participants' and organizers' displeasure. Such teams can become blacklisted by the community at large and no longer find themselves invited to future Games. This nature of self-policing (decentralized control and word-of-mouth) prevents out-of-control teams from destroying the elaborate events.

The Game culture has spawned several spinoffs in the Bay Area, including the Bay Area Treasure Hunt (BATH), Bay Area Night Game (BANG), Park Challenge, and The Iron Puzzler.  There have been several spinoffs in other parts of North America as well.  There are three yearly games in New York City that are very similar to The Game:  Midnight Madness, The Haystack, and The Great All Nighter.  There is also a yearly game in Hot Springs, Arkansas also called Midnight Madness. Midnight Madness Brevard also puts on events many times a year in Brevard County, Florida.  Midnight Madness Vermont hosts MMVT events several times a year as well.

In 2009, the first multicity Game was created, coordinated by Deborah Goldstein. Different Area Same Hunt, or DASH, the Game featured puzzles created by teams in Boston, MA, Washington, DC, Houston, TX, Los Angeles, CA, Palo Alto and San Francisco, CA, Portland, OR, and Seattle, WA. DASH was played in all 8 cities simultaneously. Since 2009, DASH has occurred several times, and continues to create and unite game communities in collaborative, multicity, realtime games.

Several new Games have appeared with modified formats, including the Black Letter Game (2012, 2015) in which the emphasis is on puzzles embedded in physical artifacts that are mailed to players on a monthly basis. No travel is required.

Notable events

During the 1999 Game, a bottle of bright green liquid was found at a game location in the New York City World Trade Center by a Marriott Hotel employee, prompting a partial evacuation of the hotel.

In the 2002 Game, "Shelby Logan's Run", player Bob Lord was severely injured after misunderstanding a clue and falling thirty feet down a disused mineshaft. The players were sent into the desert outside Las Vegas with a clue containing the warning "1306 is clearly marked. Enter ONLY 1306. Do NOT enter others." Arriving at the site from an unexpected direction, Lord mistakenly entered mineshaft 1296, not realising that the mines were numbered, and ignored anonymous, spraypainted warnings assuming that they were part of the game. The fall crushed several vertebrae and left Lord a quadriplegic, and a lawsuit was filed against the organisers of that year's Game, who were criticized for not mentioning the danger in the pre-game liability waiver. There was no Seattle-based Game for three years after the 2002 Game, although the Bay Area Game continued apace. The August 2005 "Mooncurser's Handbook" Game in Seattle, run by a group of twelve veteran Seattle Gamers, renewed the Seattle Game tradition, with a special emphasis on safety.

Specific instances and similar games

San Francisco Bay Area games
 Doctor When Game, San Francisco Bay Area, 2012
 World Henchmen Organization (WHO), San Francisco recast, 2011
 Ghost Patrol, 2008
 Pirate's BATH (BATH3), 2007
 No More Secrets, 2007
 Hogwarts and the Draconian Prophecy, 2006
 Paparazzi, 2006
 Griffiths Collection, 2005
 Justice Unlimited, 2004
 The Genome Game, 2004
 The Goonies Game, 2003
 FoBiK, 2002
 Shelby Logan's Run—The Official 'Seattle Game' 2002
 Jackpot, Las Vegas, 2002
 Zelda: A Hidden Link, 2001
 Homicide: Life on the Farm, 2001
 The 420 Game, 2001
 MegaHard, 2000
 Wonka, 1999
 Amnesia, 1999
 Dragonhunt, 1998
 The Green Game, 1997
 Star Wars, 1997
 Indiana Jones, 1996
 Godfather, 1996
 SETI, 1996
 Magic: The Gaming, 1995
 Operation: The Plague, 1995
 The Most Dangerous Game, 1994
 King Arthur, 1994
 HELL, 1994
 R.A.T.R.A.C.E.  1993
 Alice in Wonderland, 1993
 Long Ride Home, 1992
 "Circle K" Game, 1992
 Mission Improbable, 1991

Shorter Bay Area games (less than 24 hours)
 Clue: The Game, 2008
 SFMiniGame (run simultaneously in Seattle), 2008
 Midnight Madness: Back to Basics, 2008
 The Apprentice: Zorg, 2006
 CRANEA, 2005
 BATH2, 2003
 BATH1, 2001
 Overnightmare, 2003
 Magic 8-Ball, 2002
 Beanie Babies Rescue, 1998
 The Quest for Ultimate Power, 1997

Recurring Bay Area events (less than 24 hours)
Decathlon - 12 hour events from Shinteki
BANG (Bay Area Night Game)

Seattle games
 Black Letter Labs, Seattle, 2012, 2015
 World Henchmen Organization (WHO), Seattle, 2011
 The Mooncurser's Handbook, Seattle, 2005
 Shelby Logan's Run, Las Vegas, 2002
 Blau Foundation, Seattle, 2001
 VQuest, Seattle, 2000
 The N. I. T., New York, 1999
 ISETV, Los Angeles, 1998
 Thanatos Society, Seattle, 1997
 Hope2Die, Seattle, 1996
 EnGenetics, Seattle, 1995

Portland games
 WarTron, Portland, Oregon, 2012

Phoenix games
 The Hunt , annual event since 1950

Boston games
 Miskatonic University Game, 2019
 WarTron, Greater Boston Area recast, 2013
 BAPHL, (Boston Area Puzzle Hunt League) recurring event since 2010

Washington, D.C. games
 The Famine Game, Washington D.C. Metro Area, 2013

National games and games outside the US
 Cygnet LLP: Rebooting the UK Game - July 2011, London
 Girls and Boys Come Out to Play - September 2014, London
DASH (Different Area Same Hunt) - a day Game run in multiple cities simultaneously
Casino Royale: The Game - April 2007, Singapore

External links
Joe Belfiore's 2004 TED talk on The Game, including discussion of the 2002 "Shelby Logan's Run" game
Puzzle Hunt Calendar - schedule of various upcoming and ongoing events
Team Snout - links to Bay Area games, past and future, and "Game Control HOWTO" information
Game Control - Official website of The Seattle Game (currently defunct)
Shelby Logan's Run - Website detailing the entire content of the 2002 Game
Seattle GC - information source for The Game, focused around Seattle events and people (currently defunct)
Seattle Puzzling - De facto home of SNAP, basically the Seattle equivalent of BANG
THE GAME - A site of the Stanford Game
Midnight Madness AR - Midnight Madness in Hot Springs, Arkansas
Midnight Madness Brevard - Midnight Madness in Brevard County, Florida
Paregoric.org - Midnight Madness 2006 in Hot Springs, Arkansas
Midnight Madness NYC - Midnight Madness in New York City
Microsoft Intern Game - The site for the incarnation of The Game run for Microsoft's Summer Interns
The Game Princeton - A short Game run every September by graduate students at Princeton University
Encounter - International network of Game-typed urban games
Black Letter Labs - A site for the Black Letter game.

References

Road rallying
Game
Stanford University